This list of hospitals in North Dakota shows the existing hospitals in the U.S. state of North Dakota.  The sortable list gives the name, city, number of hospital beds, and references for each hospital.  In some North Dakota counties where hospitals do not exist, District Health Units or local clinics are listed.

Hospitals

See also
North Dakota#Health care

References

North Dakota
 List of hospitals
Hospitals